Kickapoo Tribal Center is a unincorporated community on the Kickapoo Reservation in Brown County, Kansas, United States.  As of the 2020 census, the population of the community and nearby areas was 177, making it the most populous location within the reservation.

Geography
Kickapoo Tribal Center is located in southwest Brown County in the southeastern part of the Kickapoo Reservation.

Demographics

For statistical purposes, the United States Census Bureau has defined this community as a census-designated place (CDP).

References

Further reading

External links
 Kansas Kickapoo Tribe official website
 Brown County maps: Current, Historic, KDOT

Census-designated places in Brown County, Kansas
Census-designated places in Kansas
Kickapoo Tribe in Kansas